Vrengen may refer to:

Places
Vrengen, Agder, a village in Arendal municipality in Agder county, Norway
Vrengen, Vestfold, a fjord or strait between Nøtterøy and Tjøme municipalities in Vestfold og Telemark county, Norway
Vrengen Bridge, a bridge over the Vrengen fjord in Vestfold og Telemark county